John Lee Richmond (May 5, 1857 – October 1, 1929) was an American pitcher in Major League Baseball. He played for the Boston Red Stockings, Worcester Worcesters, Providence Grays, and Cincinnati Red Stockings, and is best known for pitching the first perfect game in Major League history. After retiring from baseball, he became a teacher.

Early life
Richmond was born in Sheffield, Ohio, in 1857. He was the son and grandson of Baptist ministers and he had eight siblings, all of them older. He went to the college preparatory academy affiliated with Oberlin College. He started attending Brown University in 1876 and was an outfielder and pitcher on the school's baseball team. He was also class president and he played on the football team.

Professional baseball career
On June 2, 1879, Richmond was paid $10 to pitch for Worcester of the National Baseball Association in an exhibition game against the Chicago White Stockings. He pitched a seven-inning no-hitter and signed with Worcester after the game. On July 28, he pitched a no-hitter against Springfield.

Worcester joined the National League in 1880, and Richmond signed with the team for $2,400 ($ in current dollar terms) that season. Before a game against Cleveland on June 12, Richmond was up all night taking part in college graduation events, and he went to bed at 6:30 AM. He caught the 11:30 AM train for Worcester so he could pitch in the afternoon contest and then pitched a perfect game to beat Cleveland, 1–0. According to the Chicago Tribune, "The Clevelands were utterly helpless before Richmond's puzzling curves, retiring in every inning in one, two, three order, without a base hit. The Worcesters played a perfect fielding game." Cleveland pitcher Jim McCormick allowed three hits, and the only run was scored on a double error by second baseman Fred Dunlap.

Richmond graduated from Brown University four days after the perfect game, and he finished the year with a win–loss record of 32–32, a 2.15 earned run average, and 243 strikeouts in 590.2 innings pitched. He was the first left-handed pitcher to win 30 games in a season.

Richmond found success throwing an offspeed pitch that he termed a "half-stride ball" and that other players referred to as a "drop ball". He also had a rising fastball that he called a "jump ball". He also learned to throw a curveball in college, even though a Brown physics professor tried to convince him that nothing could make a ball curve in midair.

In both 1881 and 1882, Richmond pitched over 400 innings. After the 1882 season, the Worcester franchise disbanded, and Richmond played for the National League's Providence Grays in 1883. He experienced arm problems and was primarily an outfielder that year. He finished his MLB career with a record of 75–100, a 3.06 ERA, and 552 strikeouts.

Later life
In the winter of 1880, Richmond had begun to pursue a career in medicine, studying under a Providence physician, C. T. Gardner. He enrolled at the College of Physicians and Surgeons of New York a few months later, then at the University of the City of New York. After the 1883 baseball season, Richmond practiced medicine at Bellevue Hospital and with Gardner in Providence.

Richmond then changed careers, and from 1890 to 1921, he was a high school chemistry teacher at Scott High School in Toledo, Ohio. Richmond married Mary Naomi Chapin, his former student, in 1892, and had three children: Ruth, Dorothy, and Jane. He died in Toledo in 1929.

See also

List of Major League Baseball perfect games
List of Major League Baseball annual saves leaders

References

External links

1857 births
1929 deaths
19th-century baseball players
Major League Baseball pitchers who have pitched a perfect game
Boston Red Caps players
Boston Red Stockings players
Worcester Ruby Legs players
Providence Grays players
Cincinnati Red Stockings (AA) players
Worcester Grays players
Baseball players from Ohio
Physicians from Ohio
Brown Bears baseball players
People from Lorain County, Ohio
Schoolteachers from Ohio